The 1884 United States presidential election in Nebraska took place on November 4, 1884, as part of the 1884 United States presidential election. Voters chose five representatives, or electors to the Electoral College, who voted for president and vice president.

Nebraska voted for the Republican nominee, James G. Blaine, over the Democratic nominee, Grover Cleveland. Blaine won the state by a margin of 16.78%.

With 57.31% of the popular vote, Nebraska would prove to be Blaine's fifth strongest victory in terms of percentage in the popular vote after Vermont, Minnesota, Kansas and Rhode Island.

Results

Results by county

See also
 United States presidential elections in Nebraska

References

Nebraska
1884
1884 Nebraska elections